Weinfelden District is one of the five districts of the canton of Thurgau, Switzerland. Its capital is the town of Weinfelden.

The district contains the following municipalities:

References

Districts of Thurgau